Nissim Aloni (24 August 1926 – 13 June 1998) was an Israeli playwright and translator.

Biography
Aloni was born Nissim Levi to poor Bulgarian Jewish immigrant parents in Mandate Palestine. His family lived in Florentin, a low-income neighborhood in south Tel Aviv, which later became an inspiration for his work.

After graduating from high school, Aloni enlisted in the Notrut, a Jewish militia operating as an auxiliary police force alongside the British. He wrote for the weekly BaMahane, and fought in the 1948 Arab-Israeli War. Following his military service, he was appointed to the editorial board of the periodical B'Ayin and served as literary editor of Ashmoret. He studied history and French at The Hebrew University of Jerusalem.

In his later years, a stroke left him severely handicapped.  He died on 13 June, 1998 at a hospital in Tel Aviv.

Literary career

In 1953, his first play, Most Cruel the King, was produced at the national Habima Theater, creating a stir amongst theatre goers. The play focuses on the figure of Jeroboam. In 1961, Habima produced his play "The King's Clothes", which established him as one of the country's leading playwrights. In 1963, Aloni teamed up with Yossi Banai and Avner Hezkyahu to create the "Seasons Theater", for which Aloni wrote and produced the play The American Princess. From that point onward, Aloni produced all his plays. He also began writing skits for the comedy troupe Hagashash Hachiver, and produced some of their programs, such as Cinema Gashash and Cantata for Shawarma.

Many of his plays involve royalty, such as The King's Clothes, The American Princess, The Bride and the Hunter of Butterflies (adapted for television by Ram Loevy), Edi King. His other plays include The Gypsies of Jaffa, The Revolution and the Chicken, Lukas the Coward, The Raucous Dying, Napoleon Dead or Alive.

Aloni highly esteemed the actress Hanna Rovina, and wrote a play, Aunt Liza, specifically for her to act the lead part.

He has also published a collection of prose, Notes of a Stray Cat.

Awards and critical acclaim
 In 1983, Aloni was a co-recipient (jointly with Ozer Rabin) of the Bialik Prize for literature.
 In 1992, he became honorary fellow of The Sam Spiegel Film and Television School, Jerusalem. 
 In 1996, he was awarded the Israel Prize for stage arts – dramatics.

Works outside of Israel

"The American Princess" was translated from Hebrew to Swedish by Viveka Heiman and then from Swedish to Norwegian by Jens Bjorneboe. It was produced by Oslo city theater Den Nye Theater, directed by Izzy Abrahami. Abrahami convinced the Israeli consul in Oslo to invite Aloni to the premier. Aloni, who reportedly sat next to the Norwegian king, brought Abrahami an original painting by Yosl Bergner as thanks.

Commemoration
In November 2009, a street was named for him in Tel Aviv.

Published works

Plays
 (Tel Aviv, 1963) translated as "The American princess" by Richard Flantz
 (Cruel from all King) (Tel Aviv, 1968)
, a play in two acts  (Tel Aviv, 1975)
 (The Bride and the Butterfly Hunter) (Tel Aviv, 1980)
  (Napoleon Alive or Dead) (Tel Aviv, 1993)
 (Aunt Liza) (Tel Aviv, 2000)
 (The Gypsies of Jaffa) (Tel Aviv, 2000)
 (The Emperor's Clothes) (Tel Aviv, 2004)

Literature
 (Lists of Feral Cat) (Tel Aviv, 1996)

See also
List of Israel Prize recipients
List of Bialik Prize recipients

References

Further reading
 edited by Nurit Yaʻari.

External links
Nissim Aloni at the Institute for the Translation of Hebrew Literature

Israeli male dramatists and playwrights
Israeli novelists
Modern Hebrew writers
Israel Prize in theatre recipients
Jewish dramatists and playwrights
1926 births
1998 deaths
20th-century novelists
20th-century Israeli dramatists and playwrights
People from Tel Aviv
Israeli people of Bulgarian-Jewish descent
Hebrew University of Jerusalem alumni